Sacred Heart College of Lucena City is an educational institution in Lucena City, Quezon, Philippines. The first catholic learning institution in Quezon Province, it was founded on April 27, 1884. It had its roots in the vision of a simple and saintly woman named Hermana Fausta Labrador whose exemplary life was moulded on the Vincentian spirituality. The school grew and its status was changed from Academy to College in 1941. It was formally turned-over to the Daughters of Charity of Saint Vincent de Paul on August 14, 1937. 
The school's basic education division offers primary and secondary education from kindergarten through grade 12. The higher education division offers courses leading to associate degrees, bachelor's degrees, and master's degrees.

History
Sacred Heart College, the oldest Catholic institution for men and women in Quezon Province, was founded on April 27, 1884. The school had its roots in the vision of a simple and saintly woman named Fausta Labrador y Zarsadias who, at the age of 26, opened a Charity school to form the youth according to the ideals of the Catholic faith.

The mission of Hermana Uta, as she was fondly called, obtained its first shapes through Don Gregorio Merchan, a wealthy citizen of Lucena, who offered his house to serve as the first school building on April 27, 1884. Having been trained and molded by the Daughters of Charity at the Colegio de Santa Rosa, Hermana Uta later decided to leave her school in the hands of the Daughters of Charity in the twilight of her life. The school was handed over to the Sisters on August 14, 1937.

In 1939, the school was operating the complete primary, intermediate and high school courses.

Realizing the need for the good teachers founded on solid Christian ideals, the sisters deemed it necessary to open a teacher-training course. So in 1941, the school offered the Junior Normal Courses (E.T.C.). With the opening of the new course, the status of the school was changed from Academy to College. The outbreak of the war in December 1941 forced the temporary closure of the school. The school reopened in July 1942 during the Japanese occupation.

On September 14, 1942, at the age of 84, the saintly Foundress of Sacred Heart College died. But her spirit continues to live to this day in the hearts of the people she had impressed with her mission. It seemed that not even the conflagration that swept the first school building on June 11, 1944 could kill the spirit of utter selflessness. From the house of Don Gregorio Merchan to the residence of Don Agaton Rodriguez to the house of Atty. Fabian Millar to the Club X building to the present school site the spirit of the Foundress continues to permeate the corridors, the hall, the grounds and the chapel.

With the construction of the present school building, the former site of the school razed down by the big fire that hit Lucena in 1965 was transformed into a landmark. The Hermana Fausta Development Center has become the center of the school's community outreach projects for the depressed sectors of the community.

In 1975, Sr. Paz Marfori, DC, the then Dean of the College, conducted a feasibility study and applied for the opening of a College of Nursing. The approval was granted, and the department was opened in June 1976.

In 1982, the Basic Education Department took that bold step towards academic excellence by undergoing and passing the rigid requirements for accreditation of the Philippine Accrediting Association of Schools, Colleges and Universities (PAASCU). The BED have the benefit of an accredited status for more than thirty years.

In 1993, the Higher Education Department likewise made its own bid for PAASCU accreditation, passing the Preliminary Survey and the Formal Survey in February 1998. Since then, a succession of PAASCU visits ensued.

In the area of physical development, the school in the last two decades has constructed and/or developed other landmarks such as the school gymnasium 1984, the Sto. Nino Building and the St. Vincent Hall in 1993, the John Paul II Youth Formation House along with the Twin Hearts Ecology Park in 1994, a three-story building for the Basic Education Department in 1997 and the SHC Cultural Center and Gymnasium in 1999.

To meet the needs and challenges of the times, the school has opened new programs and majors in the Higher Education Department such as AB Communication, BS Psychology, and BS Computer Science. On top of these significant developments is the opening of graduate programs -  Master of Arts in Education in 1996, and Master of Science in Nursing in 2000. The opening of the BS Pharmacy and BS Management Accounting programs were its latest addition to the program offerings of the Higher Education Department.

On January 1, 2019, The main building, which houses a computer laboratory, the school chapel, offices, a library and the residential area for the sisters was razed by fire. The nearby building which is occupied by the Basic Education Department also sustained a considerable damage. 

On July 29, 2022, new and renovated buildings were blessed and turned over to the school upon its completion. Sr. Maria Ana Rosario Evidente, DC, the Visitatrix, and Sr. Ma. Teresa Fatima L. Mueda, DC, former General Councilor, led the ribbon-cutting for the new buildings. These include St. Louise de Marillac (SLM), St. Catherine Labouré (SCL), St. Vincent de Paul (SVP), and the powerhouse. Immediately after the ribbon-cutting ceremonies were the formal turnover rites at the Hermana Fausta Lounge in the SLM building. The historic event was witnessed by more than 500 guests, including stakeholders, donors, dignitaries, and public officials.

Publication
"The Pulse" is the formal publication name of the Elementary level; "The Heartbeat" for the High School level of the Basic Education Department, and "The Heart" for the Higher Education Department.

Academic programs

INTEGRATED BASIC EDUCATION 
Kindergarten
Primary Education (Grade 1-6)
Junior High School (Grade 7-10)
Senior High School (Grade 11-12) - Academic Track 
Science, Technology, Engineering and Mathematics (STEM); Accountancy, Business and Management (ABM); Humanities and Social Sciences (HUMSS)

DEGREE PROGRAMS 

BACHELOR OF ARTS IN COMMUNICATION (ABComm)

BACHELOR OF SCIENCE IN MANAGEMENT ACCOUNTING (BSMA)

BACHELOR OF SCIENCE IN ACCOUNTANCY (BSA)

BACHELOR OF SCIENCE IN PSYCHOLOGY (BSP)

BACHELOR OF SCIENCE IN COMPUTER SCIENCE (BSCS)

BACHELOR OF SCIENCE IN NURSING (BSN)

BACHELOR OF SCIENCE IN PHARMACY (BSPh)

BACHELOR OF SCIENCE IN SOCIAL WORK (BSSW)

BACHELOR OF SCIENCE IN BUSINESS ADMINISTRATION (BSBA)
Major in:
Financial Management (FM),
Marketing Management (MM),
Business Economics (BE),
Human Resource Development Management (HRDM)

BACHELOR OF ELEMENTARY EDUCATION (BEED)

BACHELOR OF SECONDARY EDUCATION (BSED)
Major in:
English,
Science,
Mathematics,
Filipino,
Social Studies

GRADUATE PROGRAMS 

Master of Science in Nursing (MSN)

Master of Arts in Education (MAEd)
Major in:
Educational Management,
English,
Filipino
Mathematics,
Religious Education,
Biological Science,
Physical Science,
Social Science

References

https://www.shc.edu.ph/

External links
Sacred Heart College
Lucena City Schools and University

Universities and colleges in Lucena, Philippines
Educational institutions established in 1884
Catholic elementary schools in the Philippines
Catholic secondary schools in the Philippines
Catholic universities and colleges in the Philippines
1884 establishments in the Spanish Empire